Helixanthera is moderately sized genus of showy mistletoe with over 40 species from tropical Africa, southern Asia and Malesia. The genus was described already 1790 by the Portuguese botanist João de Loureiro in his Flora Cochinchinensis. A new species, Helixanthera schizocalyx, was described in 2010.

Species
The Catalogue of Life includes the following species:

References 
þ

External links 

Loranthaceae
Loranthaceae genera